Scalby is a hamlet in the East Riding of Yorkshire, England. It lies on the B1230 road.

It forms part of the civil parish of Gilberdyke.

References

Villages in the East Riding of Yorkshire